Crossdoney railway station was a former station on the Inny Junction to Cavan branch of the Midland Great Western Railway, Ireland 3/4 mile from the village of Crossdoney County Cavan. It was also the junction for the branch line to Killashandra, the only intermediate station being Arva Road. The line opened in 1856 after the well known architect George Wilkinson designed the station building in the modest Italianate style. The line closed to passenger traffic in 1947 and finally to goods traffic in January 1960.  The previous station along the dismantled branch was Drumhawnagh whereas the next station along the branch is Cavan.

Both station house and goods shed survive.

References

External links
 Eiretrains - Irish Railways Past & Present - Crossdoney

Disused railway stations in County Cavan
Railway stations opened in 1856